"What About Us" is a song by American R&B group Jodeci recorded for their second album Diary of a Mad Band (1993). The song was released as the third and final single for the album in August 1994.

A "Swing Mob" remix of the song featured additional production by Timbaland and introduced former Swing Mob member Magoo.

Track listings
US Promo Vinyl and 12"
"What About Us" (Radio) - 4:25
"What About Us" (Album Extended) - 4:38
"What About Us" (Album Instrumental) - 4:38
"What About Us" (Acapella) - 4:38
"What About Us" (Jeep Mix) - 4:40

US Vinyl and 12"
"What About Us" (Album Version) - 5:20
"What About Us" (Swing Mob) - 4:36(feat. Magoo)
"What About Us" (Mr. Dalvin Version) - 4:26(feat. Mr. Dalvin)

Personnel
Information taken from Discogs.
production: DeVante Swing
remixing: DeVante Swing, Mr. Dalvin, Timbaland
Joel "JoJo" Hailey - Lead and Background vocals
Cedric "K-Ci" Hailey - Background vocals
DeVante Swing - Background vocals
Mr. Dalvin - Background vocals

Charts

Weekly charts

Year-end charts

Notes

1994 singles
Jodeci songs
Song recordings produced by DeVante Swing
Songs written by DeVante Swing
1993 songs
Uptown Records singles